The Dictionary of Fashionable Nonsense: A Guide for Edgy People is a 2006 book by Ophelia Benson and Jeremy Stangroom.

The book is a satire on postmodernism, modern jargon and anti-rationalist thinking in contemporary academia.  "Covering such schools of thought as difference feminism, deconstruction, and the sociology of knowledge, the author reveals that clotted jargon, tortured syntax, and unreadable style hides the fact that nothing new is being said."

The Times Literary Supplement said "With wit and invention, Benson and Stangroom take us through the checklist argot that so often litters postmodern texts."  Writing in The Guardian, Ben Marshall called it "a near perfect summary of the banality of postmodern discourse."

The book's authors were interviewed about the book by ABC radio in Australia.

See also
 Fashionable Nonsense

References

External links
 Fashionable Dictionary, Butterflies and Wheels

2006 non-fiction books
Criticism of postmodernism
English-language books
Popular culture books
Satirical books
Works about postmodernism
Works by Jeremy Stangroom
Works by Ophelia Benson